The 2022–23 Tennessee Lady Volunteers basketball team represents the University of Tennessee in the 2022–23 college basketball season. Led by former Lady Vol Kellie Harper, entering her fourth year as head coach, the team plays its games at Thompson–Boling Arena and is members of the Southeastern Conference.

Previous season
The 2021–22 team finished the season 25–9, 11–5 in third place in SEC play. They lost in the semifinals of the SEC tournament to their rivals, Kentucky, who went on to win the tournament. The Lady Vols also received an at-large bid to the NCAA tournament, where they lost in the Sweet Sixteen to Louisville.

Roster

Schedule

|-
!colspan=9 style=""| Exhibition

|-
!colspan=9 style=""| Regular season

|-
!colspan=9 style=""|SEC tournament

|-
!colspan=9 style=""|NCAA tournament

Rankings

References

Tennessee
Tennessee Lady Volunteers basketball seasons
Volunteers
Volunteers
Tennessee